Our Lady Queen of Angels Catholic Church in Kula is a parish of the Roman Catholic Church of Hawaii in the United States.  Located in Kula on the island of Maui, the church falls under the jurisdiction of the Diocese of Honolulu and its bishop.  It is named after a title of the Blessed Virgin Mary.

See also
Apostolic Prefecture of the Sandwich Islands

References

External links

Buildings and structures in Maui County, Hawaii
Roman Catholic churches in Hawaii
Buildings and structures in Kula, Hawaii